Del Toro may refer to:

Del Toro (surname)
Del Toro Lake, a lake situated in southern Chile
Del Toro River
San Giovanni del Toro, an eleventh-century church in Ravello, Italy
Bocas del Toro Province, a Panamanian province